Diaphus luetkeni, Luetken's lanternfish, is a species of lanternfish 
found worldwide.

Size

Etymology
The fish is named in honor of Danish zoologist Christian Frederik Lütken (1827–1901), recognizing his 1892 classification of twenty four lanternfish species.

References

Myctophidae
Taxa named by August Brauer
Fish described in 1904